The Living Room Sessions Part 1 is an album by Ravi Shankar released in 2012 through the record label East Meets West. The album earned Shankar the Grammy Award for Best World Music Album.

Accompanying musicians are tabla  player Tanmoy Bose, treble tanpura player Kenji Ota, bass tanpura player Barry Phillips and an unidentified tamboura player.

Track listing
"Raga Malgunji" – 17:18
"Raga Khamaj" – 18:57
"Raga Kedara" – 4:47
"Raga Satyajit" - 11:30

See also
 The Living Room Sessions Part 2
 Ravi Shankar discography

References

2012 albums
Ravi Shankar albums
Grammy Award for Best World Music Album